The 2000 National Hurling League, known for sponsorship reasons as the Church & General National Hurling League, was the 69th edition of the National Hurling League (NHL), an annual hurling competition for the GAA county teams. Galway won the league, beating Tipperary in the final.

Overview

Division 1

The National Hurling League's top division featured fourteen teams divided into two groups - 1A and 1B. Each group consisted of seven teams. Galway and Limerick topped division 1A while Tipperary and Waterford topped division 1B. Galway finished the league undefeated and were crowned champions after defeating Tipp in the final.

Down at the other end of the tables, Kerry and Derry failed to win a single group game and were paired against each other in the relegation play-off. Derry won that game, thus condemning Kerry to division 2 for the following year.

Division 2

Division 2 featured one group of ten teams.  Carlow and Meath topped the group and contested the final. Meath won and secured promotion to division 1A for the following year. Tyrone ended the group stage without a single victory and were relegated to division 3 for the following year.

Division 3

Division 3 featured one group of nine teams.  Louth finished the group stages undefeated and were joined in the final by Longford who recorded just one defeat. Louth won that game and secured promotion to division 2 for the following year.

Division 1

Tipperary came into the season as defending champions of the 1999 season. Derry entered Division 1 as the promoted team.

On 14 May 2000, Galway won the title following a 2-18 to 2-13 win over Tipperary in the final. It was their first league title since 1995-96 and their sixth National League title overall.

Kerry, who lost all of their group stage matches, were relegated from Division 1 after losing the relegation play-off to Derry by 1-21 to 2-4. Meath won Division 2 and secured promotion to the top tier.

Galway's Fergal Healy was the Division 1 top scorer with 8-27.

Structure

The 14 teams in Division 1 were divided into two groups of seven teams named Division 1A and Division 1B. Each team played all the others in its group once. Two points were awarded for a win and one for a draw. The first two teams in 1A and 1B advanced to the league semi-finals with the top team in Division 1A playing the second team in Division 1B and the second team in Division 1A playing the first in Division 1B. The bottom-placed teams in 1A and 1B faced each other in a play-off to determine which team would be relegated.

Division 1A Table

Group stage

Division 1B Table

Group stage

Relegation play-off

Division 1 Semi-finals

Division 1 Final

Scoring statistics

Top scorers overall

Top scorers in a single game

Miscellaneous

 Waterford's round 2 defeat of Wexford is their first home league defeat of their southeast neighbours since 1963.

Division 2

Down and Armagh entered Division 2 as the respective relegated and promoted teams from the other divisions.

On 28 May 2000, Meath won the title following a 5-14 to 2-10 win over Carlow in the final.

Tyrone, who lost all of their group stage matches, were relegated from Division 2.

Division 2 table

Group stage

Knock-out stage

Division 3

On 28 May 2000, Louth won the title following a 0-16 to 1-11 win over Longford in the final.

Division 3 table

Knock-out stage

References

League
National Hurling League seasons